Asperisporium minutulum is an ascomycete fungus that is a plant pathogen that causes the formation of leaf spots on grapes.

References

Fungal grape diseases
Leaf diseases
Capnodiales
Fungi described in 1920